Slow as Lightning is a 1923 American silent action film directed by Grover Jones and starring Kenneth MacDonald, Billy 'Red' Jones and Edna Pennington.

Cast
 Kenneth MacDonald as Jimmie March
 Billy 'Red' Jones as Jimmie March - as a Child
 Edna Pennington as Eleanor Philips
 Gordon Sackville as E.J. Philips
 William Lester as Mortimer Fenton
 William Malan as Pat Mc Guire - the Irishman 
 Joe Bonner as Tony Guasti - the Italian
 Max Asher as Isaac Cohen - the Hebrew
 Otto Metzetti as Chief of Crooks

References

Bibliography
 Munden, Kenneth White. The American Film Institute Catalog of Motion Pictures Produced in the United States, Part 1. University of California Press, 1997.

External links
 

1923 films
1920s action films
American silent feature films
American action films
American black-and-white films
Films directed by Grover Jones
1920s English-language films
1920s American films